Michelle Adair Ozbun (born February 16, 1965) is an American molecular virologist who is the Maralyn S. Budke Endowed Professor in Viral Oncology at the University of New Mexico School of Medicine. Her research considers cancer biology and how human papillomavirus infections cause pathology including their contributions to cancers.

Early life and education 
Ozbun received an associate of science degree at Mesa College (now Colorado Mesa University), where she was recognized as a Distinguished Alumnus in 2009.  She was an undergraduate student in microbiology and chemistry at Colorado State University. She completed her PhD in molecular virology under the supervision of Janet S. Butel at the Baylor College of Medicine. She completed a postdoctoral fellowship at Pennsylvania State University College of Medicine in the laboratory of Dr. Craig Meyers.

Research and career 
In 1998, Ozbun was appointed to the faculty at the University of New Mexico, where she holds an endowed chair in viral oncology. Her research considers papillomaviruses, which are etiologic agents of tumors of the skin. These tumors can be benign (e.g. genital warts, plantar warts) and malignant (e.g. anogenital cancers and cervical carcinomas). Her research looks to understand the replicative cycles of papillomaviruses and their differentiation-dependent replicative cycles through the use of organotypic cell culture. Disruptions to these replicative cycles can result in malignancies. She studies the relationships between human papillomavirus infection and cancer, studying the molecular mechanisms that underpin viral infection, the stages of infection that permit or deny how viral persistence is established.

Ozbun developed a strategy to measure how many infectious human papillomavirus particles are left on a surface following disinfection.

Selected publications

Honors & Awards 
 Elected as a Fellow, American Academy of Microbiology

Personal life 
Ozbun is lesbian. She is a member of 500 Queer Scientists.

References 

Living people
Colorado State University alumni
Baylor College of Medicine alumni
1965 births
American virologists
American women scientists
20th-century American scientists
21st-century American scientists